This is a timeline of the British home front during the First World War from 1914 to 1918. This conflict was the first modern example of total war in the United Kingdom; innovations included the mobilisation of the workforce, including many women, for munitions production, conscription and rationing. Civilians were subjected to naval bombardments, strategic bombing and food shortages caused by a submarine blockade.

1914
28 June 1914
 Assassination of Archduke Franz Ferdinand of Austria, heir to the Austro-Hungarian throne, who was killed in Sarajevo along with his wife Duchess Sophie by Bosnian Serb Gavrilo Princip.

27 July 1914
 Winston Churchill orders a "Test Mobilisation" for the Royal Navy's Home Fleet, which was at Portland Harbour following a Fleet Review by King George V

28 July 1914
 Austria-Hungary declares war on Serbia. Russia mobilizes.

29 July 1914
 The Home Fleet is ordered to its wartime anchorage at Scapa Flow in the Orkney Islands.

1 August 1914
 Germany declares war on Russia.

2 August 1914
 British cabinet decides on war.
 Germany invades Luxembourg.

3 August 1914
 Germany declares war on France. Belgium denies permission for German forces to pass through to the French border.

 Foreign Secretary Sir Edward Grey makes a speech to the House of Commons, asking Parliament to approve the use of armed force should the German Navy attack the coasts of France, or if Germany violates Belgian neutrality.

4 August 1914
 Germany invades Belgium to outflank the French army.

 British Government protests the violation of Belgian neutrality, guaranteed by the Treaty of London; German Chancellor replies that the treaty is just a chiffon de papier (a scrap of paper).

 The United Kingdom declares war on Germany.

 British mobilisation: The Army and Navy Reserves are "called out" and the Territorial Force is "embodied" by Royal Proclamation.

5 August 1914
 The Aliens Registration Act 1914 was introduced, compelling German immigrants in the United Kingdom to register with the police and making provision for the deportation or internment of those deemed to be a particular risk.

 "Your King and Country need you: a call to arms" is published by Lord Kitchener, the new Secretary of State for War, calling for 100,000 men to enlist in the army. This figure is achieved within two weeks allowing six new divisions to be formed from these volunteers, to be called Kitchener's Army. From December 1914, battalions can be recruited from a specific locality, known as "Pals battalions". By March 1915, a total of 41 new divisions have been raised.

6 August 1914
 Currency and Bank Notes Act 1914 authorises the issue of paper £1 and 10 shilling notes.

7 August 1914
 The British Expeditionary Force arrives in France.

8 August 1914
 The Defence of the Realm Act 1914 (widely known as "DORA") is passed, imposing, censorship and security controls on the civil population.

12 August 1914
 The United Kingdom declares war on Austria-Hungary.

September 1914
 German businesses in Britain are shutting down, for example the Münchener Löwenbräu London Depot.

November 1914
 First "dilution" agreement between the Engineering Employers Federation and trades unions, allowing unskilled workers (including women) to take on some of the roles usually reserved for skilled workers.

19 November 1914
 The Central Association of Volunteer Training Corps is recognised by the War Office, legitimising the many town guards and local defence companies that have been formed illegally around the country.

3 December 1914
 The No Conscription Fellowship is formed.

16 December 1914
 A squadron of German battlecruisers and other warships conduct a raid on Scarborough, Hartlepool and Whitby, resulting in 137 deaths and 592 casualties, most of whom are civilians.

1915
9 January 1915
 Kaiser Wilhelm II authorises airship raids on the United Kingdom, excluding London.

19 January 1915
 The first air raid over Britain. Two German Navy Zeppelin airships drop bombs and incendiaries over Great Yarmouth and King's Lynn in Norfolk; four civilians are killed and sixteen injured.

12 February 1915
 The Kaiser authorises airship raids on the London Docks.

18 February 1915
 The Kaiser authorises an unrestricted submarine blockade of the United Kingdom.

16 March 1915
 Defence of the Realm (Amendment) (No 2) Act allows the government to force engineering firms to accept contracts for war related work.

27 March 1915
 Commander-in-Chief of the BEF, Sir John French gave an interview to The Times highlighting the shortage of artillery ammunition at the front. This scandal was to become known the Shell Crisis.

16 April 1915
 A single German Albatros B.II aircraft bombs Sittingbourne and Faversham in Kent; the first raid by an aeroplane. There are no casualties.

7 May 1915
 The sinking of the British ocean liner RMS Lusitania by a U-boat, with the loss of 1,198 passengers and crew, provokes anti-German riots in London and other cities. Mobs target shops and businesses owned by Germans or those with German surnames.

26 May 1915
 Prime Minister H. H. Asquith announces his new ministry, a coalition government with the Conservative Party. David Lloyd George was made Minister of Munitions, relieving Kitchener of that aspect of his role. Churchill is relieved of control of the Admiralty following the failure of the Gallipoli Campaign.

31 May 1915
 First air raid on London; an Army Zeppelin dropped bombs over north and east London killing seven civilians.

July 1915
 Women's War Agricultural Committees established to encourage more women to work on the land.

2 July 1915
 The Munitions of War Act 1915 becomes law, regulating the wages, hours and conditions of munitions workers. It becomes an offence for a worker to leave employment at a "Controlled Establishment" without the consent of the employer.

15 July 1915
 National Registration Act 1915 was passed, requiring all men and women between the ages of 15 and 65 to register their address.

17 July 1915
 Emmeline Pankhurst leads a "Women's Right to Serve" demonstration in Trafalgar Square, London.

3 September 1915
 Lieutenant Leefe Robinson flying a BE2 biplane, shoots down the first German airship over British soil. The Schütte-Lanz SL 11, which had been bombing north London and Saint Albans, crashed in flames at Cuffley in Hertfordshire.

16 October 1915
 Start enrolment for the Derby Scheme which encouraged men of military eligibility to voluntarily attest their willingness to join the armed forces at a later date. After attesting, men were placed on the Class B army reserve list until required. In return, they received a day's army pay and a khaki brassard which they could wear with their civilian clothes.

15 December 1915
 Finish of the Derby Scheme (originally planned for 30 November); although 2,950,514 men had attested, enlisted or tried to enlist during the scheme, a further 2,060,927 eligible men had refused to do so, increasing pressure for conscription.

1916

2 March 1916
 Military Service Act 1916 comes into force, introducing compulsory conscription in Great Britain but not Ireland.  Men from 18 to 41 years old were liable to be called up for service in the army unless they were married, widowed with children, serving in the Royal Navy, a minister of religion, or working in one of a number of reserved occupations. Local Military Service Tribunals could grant exemption from service, usually conditional or temporary.

2 April 1916
 An explosion at a munitions factory in Faversham kills 115 workers.

24–29 April 1916
 Easter Uprising by Irish Nationalists in Dublin.

21 May 1916
 Daylight saving introduced in Britain, to save fuel for lighting and encourage longer working hours.

5 June 1916
 Lord Kitchener dies when the cruiser, HMS Hampshire, which is carrying him to Russia, hits a mine and sinks off the coast off the coast of Scotland. Lloyd George succeeds him as Secretary of State for War.

10 August 1916
 London première of The Battle of the Somme, giving audiences their first realistic impression of a modern battlefield. It is estimated that 20 million Britons had seen the film during the first six weeks of its release.

5 December 1916
 Lloyd George resigns as Minister of War, after Asquith fails to agree Lloyd George's plan for a new "War Council", prompting Asquith's resignation as Prime Minister the next day.
 
7 December 1916
 David Lloyd George forms a new coalition government.

22 December 1916
    The first Ministry of Food was established under a food controller who, under the New Ministries and Secretaries Act 1916, was empowered to regulate the supply and consumption of food and take steps for encouraging food production. The Ministry was dissolved on 31 March 1921.

1917
19 January 1917
 An explosion at a munitions factory in Slivertown, West Ham, kills 73 people.

2 February 1917
 Corn Production Act 1917 guarantees minimum prices for staple food crops and lays down minimum wages for agricultural workers. It also initiates a "compulsory plough policy" which can force landowners to cultivate their land.

March 1917
 A shortage of wheat leads to the introduction of "Government bread", which contains a proportion of flour made from oats, barley, rye or even potatoes.
 Women's Land Army and Women's Forestry Corps are established.
 
28 March 1917
 Ministry of National Service is established.

21 May 1917
 The first National Kitchen is opened by Queen Mary in Westminster Bridge Road, London, providing cheap meals for those affected by food shortages.

25 May 1917
 First raid on England by German Gotha heavy bomber aircraft at Folkestone in Kent.

29 May 1917
 A royal proclamation issued by King George V encourages a voluntary reduction in bread consumption.

13 June 1917
 First attack on London by German heavy bombers; 104 civilians were killed, including 18 children at an Upper North Street School in Poplar.

July 1917
 The Metropolitan Police introduce their first air raid warning system, which consists of police officers detonating maroons (a type of loud firework) and the "all clear" to be sounded by Boy Scout buglers.

17 July 1917
 A royal proclamation issued by George V declares: "Our House and Family shall be styled and known as the House and Family of Windsor", thus renouncing their German titles.

4 September 1917
 First night-time bomber raid on London.

2 November 1917
 The Foreign Secretary, Arthur Balfour, makes his "Declaration" of the British intention to provide "a national home for the Jewish people" in Palestine, which is being captured from the Ottoman Empire.

17 December 1917
 Residents of Pontypool are issued with ration cards for sugar, tea, butter and margarine.

29 November 1917
 Former cabinet minister, Henry Petty-Fitzmaurice, 5th Marquess of Lansdowne, writes a letter to the Daily Telegraph appealing for a peaceful settlement to the war which would become known as the "Lansdowne Letter".

31 December 1917
 National sugar rationing is introduced.

1918

January 1918
 Women's Royal Naval Service is established.

1 January 1918
 Food rationing on certain items introduced in Birmingham, soon followed by other major towns and cities.

5 January 1918
 Lloyd George makes his War Aims speech to trades union leaders, setting out the government's terms for peace with the Central Powers.

16 February 1918
 First 1,000 kilogram (2,205 pound) bomb is dropped on London during the twelfth night bomber raid.

25 February 1918
 Start of rationing of meat and fats in London and the Home Counties.

1 April 1918
 Women's Royal Air Force is established.

18 April 1918
 Military Service (No. 2) Act 1918 extends conscription up to age 50 and to residents of Ireland; although the latter is never implemented because of the Conscription Crisis.

19 May 1918
 The "Whitsun Raid" the largest and last of 17 bomber aeroplane raids on London; 49 civilians are killed in London and Essex. The total number of civilian casualties from air raids since 1915 within London's Metropolitan Police District was 668 killed and 1,938 injured.

10 June 1918
 Representation of the People Act 1918 gives the vote to women over 30.

31 August 1918
 Metropolitan Police go on strike.

28 October 1918
 Peak mortality of the Spanish flu pandemic in the UK.

11 November 1918
 Lloyd George announces that an armistice has been signed and that hostilities will cease at 11 am. Church bells are rung and the Royal Family appear on the balcony of Buckingham Palace before cheering crowds.

Notes

References
 Beckett, Ian Frederick William (1985), A Nation in Arms: A Social Study of the British Army in the First World War, Manchester University Press 1985, 
 Beckett, Ian Frederick William (2006), Home Front 1914–1918: How Britain Survived the Great War, The National Archives, 
 Castle, Ian and Hook, Christa (2010), London 1917–18: The Bomber Blitz, Osprey Publishing, 
 Doyle, Peter (2012), First World War Britain, Shire Books 
 White, Jerry (2014), Zeppelin Nights: London in the First World War , Bodley Head, 

World War I